Into the Universe with Stephen Hawking is a 2010 science documentary television mini-series written by British physicist Stephen Hawking. The series was created for Discovery Channel by Darlow Smithson Productions and features computer generated imagery of the universe created by Red Vision. The series premiered on 25 April 2010 in the United States and started on 9 May 2010 in the United Kingdom with a modified title, Stephen Hawking's Universe (not to be confused with the 1997 PBS series by the same name).

An original soundtrack was composed for the series by television and film composer Sheridan Tongue, combining symphonic orchestral recordings with electronic and sampled elements. The score was recorded and mixed in 5.1 surround sound for HD broadcast and DVD and Blu-ray release. The first episode, "Aliens" was uploaded on documentary video hosting service Vimeo 26 April 2010. Other episodes are available on same website. In addition, the episodes are also available on iTunes for purchase. However, the episodes are only available as TV shows.

Hawking appears on screen in linking scenes using his own synthesized voice, while the voice-over narration is provided, in character as Hawking, by actor Benedict Cumberbatch, who played the physicist in the 2004 BBC TV film Hawking.

Episodes 
Episode 1: AliensEpisode 2: Time Travel
Episode 3: The Story of Everything (At least some portions of this episode were used for the premiere episode of Curiosity, entitled "Did God create the universe?".)

See also
Brave New World with Stephen Hawking
How the Universe Works
Killers of the Cosmos
The Planets and Beyond
Stephen Hawking's Universe
Strip the Cosmos
Through the Wormhole
The Universe

References

External links
 
 
 Into the Universe with Stephen Hawking video playlist 

2010 American television series debuts
2010s American television miniseries
Discovery Channel original programming
English-language television shows
Documentary television series about science